Artemus Lamb Gates (November 3, 1895 – June 14, 1976) was an American businessman, naval aviator, and Assistant Secretary of the Navy for Air in charge of naval aviation efforts in World War II (December 7, 1941 – June 30, 1945). He also was briefly Undersecretary of the Navy (July 3, 1945 – September 2, 1945). He was, at various times, president of New York Trust Company, and a director of Union Pacific, Time, Boeing, Middle South Utilities, Safeway Inc., Abercrombie & Fitch Co., and Servo Corp.

Background
A great grandson of lumber baron Chancy Lamb and a grandson of lumber baron Artemus Lamb, he grew up at "Oakhurst" in Clinton, Iowa. He was graduated from Hotchkiss School in 1914 and received his B.A. degree as a member of the class of 1918 at Yale University. He was a member of Skull and Bones, one of the best known of the secret societies based at Yale University. Gates was captain-elect of the Yale football team in 1917.

Military service
During World War I, the First Yale Unit of the Naval Reserve Flying Corps was closely associated with the Skull and Bones. The Yale Unit was often referred to snidely as the millionaire squadron. While training in Florida, the pilots often were wheeled to their planes in wheel chairs pushed by Black porters. Artemus Gates was a member of the Yale Unit. He helped rescue downed fliers, was shot down, taken prisoner by the Germans and escaped. Previous flying experience enabled him to become an ensign in naval aviation in March 1917. He was released from active service in February 1919, as lieutenant-commander. Because of service on the front, Mr. Gates was decorated by the United States government with the Navy Distinguished Service Medal, by Great Britain with the Distinguished Flying Cross, and by France with the Croix de Guerre and was made an officer of the Legion of Honor of France.

Marriage

Gates married Alice Trubee Davison, a banking heiress and a sister of fellow Bonesman F. Trubee Davison, on January 3, 1922. They had two daughters, Diane and Cynthia.

References

History of the Lumber and Forest Industry of the Northwest by George W. Hotchkiss Illustrated Chicago 1898 p. 590–593
The Clinton Advertiser Monday December 20, 1915, p. 6
1886 History of Clinton Lamb, Chancy 165 & 170–171
Iowa Its History and Its Foremost Citizens The S.J. Clarke Publishing Company 1916 p. 1830
The Saturday Evening Post December 21, 1918, p. 12
The Clinton Herald Monday December 10, 1945, p. 8
Wolf's History of Clinton 1911 p. 731
1946 History of Clinton p. 50, 69, 88, 97, 98, 143 & 169
The History of Clinton 1976 The Almanac p. 536
The Iowan September 1956
Biography Index. Volume 10: September 1973 – August 1976. New York: H.W. Wilson Co., 1977.
Biography Index. Volume 12: September 1979 – August 1982. New York: H.W. Wilson Co., 1983.
The National Cyclopaedia of American Biography. Volume 59. New York: James T. White & Co., 1980.
Biography and Genealogy Master Index. Farmington Hills, Mich.: Gale Group, 1980-2

1895 births
1976 deaths
American football tackles
Hotchkiss School alumni
Yale University alumni
Union Pacific Railroad people
United States Under Secretaries of the Navy
People from Clinton, Iowa
Military personnel from Iowa
Recipients of the Navy Distinguished Service Medal
United States Assistant Secretaries of the Navy